A preservative is a substance or a chemical that is added to products such as food products, beverages, pharmaceutical drugs, paints, biological samples, cosmetics, wood, and many other products to prevent decomposition by microbial growth or by undesirable chemical changes. In general, preservation is implemented in two modes, chemical and physical. Chemical preservation entails adding chemical compounds to the product. Physical preservation entails processes such as refrigeration or drying. Preservative food additives reduce the risk of foodborne infections, decrease microbial spoilage, and preserve fresh attributes and nutritional quality.  Some physical techniques for food preservation include dehydration, UV-C radiation, freeze-drying, and refrigeration. Chemical preservation and physical preservation techniques are sometimes combined.

Food preservation

Preservatives have been used since prehistoric times. Smoked meat for example has phenols and other chemicals that delay spoilage. The preservation of foods has evolved greatly over the centuries and has been instrumental in increasing food security. The use of preservatives other than traditional oils, salts, paints, etc. in food began in the late 19th century, but was not widespread until the 20th century.

The use of food preservatives varies greatly depending on the country. Many developing countries that do not have strong governments to regulate food additives face either harmful levels of preservatives in foods or a complete avoidance of foods that are considered unnatural or foreign. These countries have also proven useful in case studies surrounding chemical preservatives, as they have been only recently introduced. In urban slums of highly populated countries, the knowledge about contents of food tends to be extremely low, despite consumption of these imported foods.

Antimicrobial preservatives
Antimicrobial preservatives prevent degradation by bacteria. This method is the most traditional and ancient type of preserving—ancient methods such as pickling and adding honey prevent microorganism growth by modifying the pH level. The most commonly used antimicrobial preservative is lactic acid. Common antimicrobial preservatives are presented in the table. Nitrates and nitrites are also antimicrobial. The detailed mechanism of these chemical compounds range from inhibiting growth of the bacteria to the inhibition of specific enzymes. Water-based home and personal care products use broad-spectrum preservatives, such as isothiazolinones and formaldehyde releasers, which may cause sensitization, leading to allergic skin.

Antioxidants

The oxidation process spoils most food, especially those with a high fat content.  Fats quickly turn rancid when exposed to oxygen. Antioxidants prevent or inhibit the oxidation process. The most common antioxidant additives are ascorbic acid (vitamin C) and ascorbates. Thus, antioxidants are commonly added to oils, cheese, and chips. Other antioxidants include the phenol derivatives BHA, BHT, TBHQ and propyl gallate.  These agents suppress the formation of hydroperoxides. Other preservatives include ethanol and methylchloroisothiazolinone.

A variety of agents are added to sequester (deactivate) metal ions that otherwise catalyze the oxidation of fats.  Common sequestering agents are disodium EDTA, citric acid (and citrates), tartaric acid, and lecithin.

Nonsynthetic compounds for food preservation
Citric and ascorbic acids target enzymes that degrade fruits and vegetables, e.g., mono/polyphenol oxidase which turns surfaces of cut apples and potatoes brown. Ascorbic acid and tocopherol, which are vitamins, are common preservatives.  Smoking entails exposing food to a variety of phenols, which are antioxidants.  Natural preservatives include rosemary and oregano extract, hops, salt, sugar, vinegar, alcohol, diatomaceous earth and castor oil.

Traditional preservatives, such as sodium benzoate have raised health concerns in the past. Benzoate was shown in a study to cause hypersensitivity in some asthma sufferers. This has caused reexamination of natural preservatives which occur in vegetables.

Public awareness of food preservation

Public awareness of food preservatives is uneven. Americans have a perception that food-borne illnesses happen more often in other countries. This may be true, but the occurrence of illnesses, hospitalizations, and deaths are still high. It is estimated by the Centers for Disease Control (CDC) that each year there are 76 million illnesses, 325,000 hospitalizations, and 5,000 deaths linked to food-borne illness.

Food suppliers are facing difficulties with regards to the safety and quality of their products as a result of the rising demand for ready-to-eat fresh food products. Artificial preservatives meet some of these challenges by preserving freshness for longer periods of time, but these preservatives can cause negative side-effects as well. Sodium nitrite is a preservative used in lunch meats, hams, sausages, hot dogs, and bacon to prevent botulism. It serves the important function of controlling the bacteria that cause botulism, but sodium nitrite can react with proteins, or during cooking at high heats, to form carcinogenic N-nitrosamines. It has also been linked to cancer in lab animals. The commonly used sodium benzoate has been found to extend the shelf life of bottled tomato paste to 40 weeks without loss of quality. However, it can form the carcinogen benzene when combined with vitamin C. Many food manufacturers have reformed their products to eliminate this combination, but a risk still exists. Consumption of sodium benzoate may also cause hyperactivity. For over 30 years, there has been a debate about whether or not preservatives and other food additives can cause hyperactivity. Studies have found that there may be increases in hyperactivity amongst children who consume artificial colorings and benzoate preservatives and who are already genetically predisposed to hyperactivity, but these studies were not entirely conclusive. Hyperactivity only increased moderately, and it was not determined if the preservatives, colorings, or a combination of the two were responsible for the increase.

See also

References

External links
 

 
Chemical substances
Food ingredients